The third season of Demark har talent aired on TV2 on 7 January 2017 and finished on 8 April 2017. The series will be again host by Christopher Læssø and Felix Schmidt. On the judging panel Jarl Friis-Mikkelsen, Cecilie Lassen, Nabiha and Peter Frödin will return while. Once again in this season the golden buzzer is available for each judge—and for the hosts for the first time—to press once the whole season to put one act straight through to the live shows. The competition was won by Drummer Johanne Astrid while Mind Reader Mads Fencker came Second and Acrobats Rasta Mizizi Acrobats came third.

Semi-finals
The semi finals began on 4 March 2017. 7 acts will perform every week. 1 act will advanced from the public vote 1 act will advanced from the judges vote

Semi-final summary

Semi Finals 1

Semi Finals 2

Semi Finals 3

Semi Finals 4

Semi Finals 5

  Due to the majority vote for Villain State of Mind, Cecilie's voting intention was not revealed.

Final

Final summary

References

2017 Danish television seasons
Got Talent